"Come Outside" is a song written by Charles Blackwell. A recording credited to Mike Sarne with accompaniment directed by Charles Blackwell featuring Wendy Richard reached number one in the UK Singles Chart in 1962.  The track stayed at No.1 for a fortnight during the weeks commencing 28 June and 5 July 1962. The song was placed twelfth on the chart of overall single sales for the calendar year 1962 in the UK.

In 1962 Alan Klein, later of the New Vaudeville Band, made a video
of this song with Julie Samuel. In 1991, Samantha Fox, Frank Bruno, Liz Kershaw and Bruno Brookes recorded a cover version as the official Children in Need single of the year.

References

External links
Michaelsarne.net

1962 singles
1962 songs
UK Singles Chart number-one singles
Parlophone singles
Songs written by Charles Blackwell (music producer)
Novelty songs